Brumunddal Church is a parish church of the Church of Norway in Ringsaker Municipality in Innlandet county, Norway. It is located in the village of Brumunddal. It is one of the two churches for the Brumunddal/Veldre parish which is part of the Ringsaker prosti (deanery) in the Diocese of Hamar. The brown wood and white brick church was built in a long church design in 1965 using plans drawn up by the architects Molle Cappelen, Per Cappelen, and Svein Erik Lundby. The church seats about 350 people.

History

The parish made plans for a new church in Brumunddal during the 1960s. Molle Cappelen, Per Cappelen, and Svein Erik Lundby were hired to design the new church. The large nave has seating for about 350 people. On one side of the nave there is a church hall and on the other side is an extension with a priest's office, sacristy, and baptismal waiting room.

See also
List of churches in Hamar

References

Churches in Ringsaker
Churches in Innlandet
Long churches in Norway
Brick churches in Norway
Wooden churches in Norway
20th-century Church of Norway church buildings
Churches completed in 1965
1965 establishments in Norway